Aspergillus pulvericola is a species of fungus in the genus Aspergillus. It is from the Circumdati section. The species was first described in 2004. A. pulvericola produces ochratoxin A.

Growth and morphology

A. pulvericola has been cultivated on both Czapek yeast extract agar (CYA) plates and Malt Extract Agar Oxoid® (MEAOX) plates. The growth morphology of the colonies can be seen in the pictures below.

References

pulvericola
Fungi described in 2014